Blue Lady may refer to:

 "Blue Lady" (song), a song by Hello Sailor
 "Blue Lady", a song by Labi Siffre from Crying Laughing Loving Lying
 Blue lady orchid (Thelymitra crinita), a species endemic to Australia
 SS Blue Lady, originally SS France, an ocean liner
 (Untitled) Blue Lady, a sculpture by Navjot Altaf

See also 
 Blue Lady's War, a fictional war in the Dragonlance novels
 Lady Blue (disambiguation)